Darnell "Dee" Bristol is a member of The Deele and a songwriter who co-wrote The Deele's "Two Occasions". Years later, he would be credited as a co-writer of Mariah Carey's "We Belong Together", when Carey would be reusing portions of "Two Occasions".

Bristol is currently performing in a reformed Deele that includes three other original bandmembers, Carlos "Satin" Greene, Kevin "Kayo" Roberson, and Stanley "Stick" Burke.

Personal life
Bristol's children include Kevin, Nikki, Jeremy, Jade, Jewllian and Arran.

References

Year of birth missing (living people)
Living people
African-American songwriters
American male songwriters
21st-century African-American people